John Coffey Hollenback (August 10, 1884 – 1959) was an American football player and coach.  He served as the head football coach at Franklin & Marshall College from 1908 to 1909, Pennsylvania State University in 1910, and Pennsylvania Military College, now Widener University in 1911, compiling a career college football record of 21–11–3.

Hollenback was the older brother of Bill Hollenback, who was also a head football coach at Penn State. On December 28, 1910, he married Lulu Rowland, the daughter of Charles Hedding Rowland.

Head coaching record

References

1884 births
1959 deaths
Franklin & Marshall Diplomats football coaches
Penn State Nittany Lions football coaches
Penn Quakers football players
Widener Pride football coaches
People from Clearfield County, Pennsylvania
Players of American football from Pennsylvania